Colerain Township may refer to:
 Colerain Township, Belmont County, Ohio
 Colerain Township, Hamilton County, Ohio
 Colerain Township, Ross County, Ohio
 Colerain Township, Lancaster County, Pennsylvania
 Colerain Township, Bedford County, Pennsylvania

Township name disambiguation pages